Women Against State Pension Inequality (WASPI) is a voluntary UK-based organisation founded in 2015 that campaigns against the way in which the state pension age for men and women was equalised. They call for the millions of women affected by the change to receive compensation.

History
The 1995 Pensions Act increased the state pension age for women from 60 to 65 in order to equalise the age with men, with the change to be phased in over ten years from 2010 for women born between 1950 and 1955. This transition was later sped up by the 2011 Pensions Act. Both the 1995 and 2011 changes came as a shock to many, with women discovering that they would have to wait up to six years longer for their state pension, potentially affecting their retirement plans. In 2015, WASPI was formed by five women to argue for the government to provide transitional payments to women born in the 1950s receiving their pension after the age of 60. They also call for compensation to women who now receive a state pension but had to wait longer.

Three of the original founders stepped down as leaders after a split in August 2016. A further three directors resigned in February 2018 following an emergency board meeting held the previous month where irreconcilable differences led to the resignations.

Actions
WASPI's online petition to Parliament received over 100,000 signatures resulting in a parliamentary debate on the issue of the changes to the state pension age.

WASPI crowdfunded £100,000 to pay for legal action in order to challenge these changes. The money was used to take legal advice and on 8 March 2017, the group wrote to the Department for Work and Pensions threatening legal action if the government did not help lessen the impact on the affected women. This move coincided with International Women's Day and a march in London that many WASPI members attended.

The organisation also has a number of groups across the country who campaign locally, including by asking their constituency MPs to sign the WASPI pledge.

Response
Since the launch of WASPI, the issue of the state pension age has become more prominent leading to its discussion in a number of parliamentary debates. The issue played an important part in the 2017 general election with Labour's Jeremy Corbyn raising it in a session of Prime Minister's Questions and the SNP pledging to support the women. However, the Conservative government rejected the calls of the WASPI, arguing that they had to make the state pension more affordable for taxpayers and requiring men to work longer than women by 5-7 years was grossly unfair and potentially illegal. Furthermore, the WASPI campaign has been criticised by some commentators who point out that the change equalised pension ages and the claims of WASPI campaigners to the contrary is both sexist and unfounded.

On 23 November 2019, Labour Party shadow chancellor John McDonnell pledged £58 billion to compensate all women born in the 1950s whose pension age was increased by the Pensions Act 1995.

See also
State Pension (United Kingdom)

References

External links

Pensions in the United Kingdom
Social security in the United Kingdom
Feminist protests
Political advocacy groups in the United Kingdom
Organizations established in 2015
2015 establishments in the United Kingdom